Michel Jean de Wolf (born 19 January 1958) is a Belgian football coach and retired player who played as a left back.

Club career
De Wolf was born in Nivelles, Walloon Brabant. During his career in his homeland, he played, always as first-choice safe for one season out of 17, for R.W.D. Molenbeek, K.A.A. Gent (winning the 1984 Belgian Cup), K.V. Kortrijk and R.S.C. Anderlecht. He arrived at the age of 32, winning three leagues).

In the 1994 summer, 36-year-old de Wolf moved abroad, signing with Olympique de Marseille of Ligue 2 – the French club had just been relegated due to a match-fixing scandal – playing in more than 40 official games in one sole season after which he retired from professional football, still going on to appear for K.F.C. Avenir Lembeek and KSC Grimbergen at amateur level (and as player-coach).

International career
De Wolf was capped 42 times for the Belgium national team, his debut coming in 1980, and appeared at three FIFA World Cups: he played two matches in the 1986 edition, four in 1990 scoring from 35 meters in the Diables Rouges 2–0 group stage win against South Korea and another four (at 36) in 1994.

De Wolf was also selected for UEFA Euro 1984, in France.

 Honours Gent Belgian Cup: 1984Anderlecht Belgian First Division: 1990–91, 1992–93, 1993–94
 Belgian Cup: 1994
 Belgian Super Cup: 1991, 1993Marseille Ligue 2: 1994–95Belgium FIFA World Cup: fourth place 1986Individual'
 Best Gent Player of the Season: 1985–86, 1986–87

References

External links

1958 births
Living people
People from Nivelles
Footballers from Walloon Brabant
Belgian footballers
Association football defenders
Belgian Pro League players
R.W.D. Molenbeek players
K.A.A. Gent players
K.V. Kortrijk players
R.S.C. Anderlecht players
Ligue 2 players
Olympique de Marseille players
Belgium international footballers
UEFA Euro 1984 players
1986 FIFA World Cup players
1990 FIFA World Cup players
1994 FIFA World Cup players
Belgian expatriate footballers
Expatriate footballers in France
Belgian expatriate sportspeople in France
Belgian football managers
K.V. Kortrijk managers
Gabon national football team managers
R.W.D.M. Brussels F.C. managers